Ngô Đình Khả (吳廷可, 1856–1923 but some sources state 1850–1925) was a high-ranking Catholic mandarin in the Court of the Emperor Thành Thái in Huế, Vietnam. He helped established the Quoc Hoc in Hue and was also a confidant to the emperor. He strongly opposed the French dominance of the Hue Court and when the French grew tired of Emperor Thành Thái's attempts to rein in their growing influence, Kha was the only member of the Council of Ministers to refuse to sign a petition requesting the emperor's abdication. This led to him gaining widespread renown for his loyalty. However, it also led to his removal from the court and his subsequent banishment to his home village. Kha is best known for being the patriarch of the Ngô Dinh family, which was the most prominent Vietnamese Catholic family. His son Ngô Đình Diệm was the first president of South Vietnam and his son Ngô Đình Thục was the third Vietnamese Catholic Bishop. Kha has sometimes been seen as a collaborator with the French. However, more recent scholarship has shown that he may be a forgotten nationalist.

Background

Early life 
Michael Ngô Dinh Kha was born in 1856 in Le Thuy in Quảng Bình Province. He was the son of James Ngô Dinh Niem and Ursula Khoa. It was recorded that Ngô Dinh Niem was a mandarin but there are some controversies as Kha had claimed to be a first-generation mandarin.

Education 
Not much is known about the early education of Ngô Dinh Kha. However, in 1873, Kha, together with Nguyễn Hữu Bài were sent to the MEP Major Seminary in Penang, Malaysia. In Penang, he became well versed in Latin and French as well as Western Philosophy. However, Penang was a melting-pot of cultures from Vietnam to Southern China, Siam, Korea and India. Students from these different areas lived and studied together and this led to them being more globally-minded. Many of those who went to the seminary did not end up becoming priests but served in administration.

Tragedy 
Tragedy struck the Ngô family while Kha was still studying in the MEP Seminary in Penang. Some sources had claimed that Van Than militiamen had surrounded his parish church in Dai Phong village and burned it down killing everyone inside. This included most of his family members, except his mother who managed to escape. However, the Van Than (Intellectual Period) movement was an offshoot from the Cần Vương Movement that emerged after Emperor Hàm Nghi was captured in 1888. It was led primarily by scholar officials. This would mean that he would have already graduated from the seminary by then and so it may not have been the Van Than militia that committed this act. Other sources claimed that the riot was led by Buddhist monks, in the 1880s, that nearly wiped out the Ngô family and that more than a hundred members of the Ngô family had perished in the fire. Both these timelines are odd because sources claim that he had returned in the 1870s.

Return to Vietnam 
When Kha returned to Vietnam in the late 1870s, he had originally planned to become a Catholic priest. However, the newly established French colonial state needed someone to help them with interpreting. Thus, together with Nguyễn Hữu Bài, Kha became an interpreter. Later, he joined the Nguyễn civil service. He managed to pass all the sessions of the Imperial Examinations owing to his firm grasp of the Chinese Classics. He then went on to serve as a military command advisor under Emperor Đồng Khánh. Following that, he left the service to take care of his mother.

Quoc Hoc 
Due to his strength in both the Chinese Confucian Classics and in the European languages and philosophy, Emperor Thành Thái requested that Kha build and head a National Institute (Quốc Học) that would combine Eastern and Western studies. This suited Kha who was a strong proponent of the Franco-Annamite curriculum. The Franco-Annamite schools were not meant as a form of assimilation but rather "an improvement of indigenous skills through relevant education". The Quoc Hoc was established on 17 September 1896 in the eighth year to Thành Thái's reign. Ngô Dinh Kha was the Principal of the school. A Saigon newspaper article published when Kha's son Thuc was getting ordained a bishop praise Kha for, "In an era when the Annamite elite, represented by Mandarins, was hostile to modern progress, Kha had the courage to take on the difficult task of mediating between the prejudices of the mandarins and the need for modern progress.

Notable graduates of the Quoc Hoc included Võ Nguyên Giáp and Phạm Văn Đồng. Ho Chi Minh also attended the school but dropped out in 1909 when his father lost his post as a district chief.

Other positions 
Following his service to the Quoc Hoc, Kha joined the palace first as Commander or the Palace Guards and then as the Minister of Rites. He was also an imperial tutor who tutored the emperor and his brothers in French. In 1902, the Emperor granted him the title of Great Scholar Assistant to the Throne. He was a trusted advisor and a close confidant of the young emperor.

Activism against French

French policy towards Emperor Thành Thái 
In 1897, when Emperor Thành Thái had come of age, the French established a Council of Ministers which consisted of Vietnamese Ministers as well as French officials. This body was under the presidency of the Resident Superior in Hue. In 1898, the French administration in Annam took over the collection of taxes from the Hue Court. The Resident Superior would then transfer a sum of money annually to the imperial treasury to support the maintenance of the imperial family, the imperial services and the civil service. The French government had effectively, "put the imperial government on an allowance."

Emperor Thành Thái could not stand his powerlessness and tried to assert himself more. However, the French were not interested in granting the Vietnamese any power and thus looked for a way to get rid of him. Emperor Thành Thái, suspecting that the French wanted to depose him tried to portray himself as a selfish playboy that would do no harm to French colonial ambitions. However, the French saw through his charade and decided to use it against him by spreading false rumours about his behavior with women. Thành Thái then tried to get the French to think he was crazy and thus, again, not a threat to their ambitions. Yet again, the French used this against him and tried to get him removed on the grounds of a lack of mental capacity to rule.

The French chargé d'affaires, Mr. Silvain Levecque was the man who wanted to bring down Emperor Thành Thái and replace him with someone more pliant. He was not the Resident Superior but he was rather in charge of current affairs while the French appointed a Resident Superior. Levecque had prepared a list of mandarins for promotion to the different ministries. However, he did not consult with the emperor and instead merely presented Emperor Thành Thái with the memorandum for promotion. This enraged the emperor and made him feel even more like a puppet. When Thành Thái refused to sign, Levecque insisted that Thành Thái should abdicate to a Council of Regents.

Kha's stand 
Levecque then forced the Council of Ministers to sign a petition requesting Thành Thái abdicate. He warned them that not signing the request would be tantamount to a rebellion against France. However, Ngô Dinh Kha refused to sign the request and resigned instead. Without his signature Levecque would be unable to claim that he had agreed to the removal of Thành Thái and this allowed Kha to write to newspapers both in Vietnam and France about what was happening with regards to the emperor. Levecque forced Nguyen Huu Bai to get Kha's signature, Bai refused and offered his resignation as well. However, this was not a good idea for Levecque as Bai and Kha were the only two Catholics in the Imperial Court and if both of them were dismissed at the same time, Levecque would not be able to deal with the repercussions back in France.

Eventually Levecque presented the petition requesting the emperor's abdication to Thành Thái without Ngô Dinh Kha's signature. At this point, Kha sent the articles to both the French and Vietnamese press denouncing Levecque's actions.

Kha's stand against the French became known throughout Vietnam. Some scholars have noted that there were folk songs and poems written about his bravery. Edward Miller writes that Ho Chi Minh himself recalled one of the proverbs, "To deport the King, you must first get rid of Kha."

Repercussions 
The Council of Regents, presided over by Levecque sentenced Ngô Dinh Kha to be stripped of all his ranks, functions and honours. He was to be sent back to his native village in Le Thuy, in the province of Quảng Bình. He would also not receive his pension which was entitled to him. Bai pleaded with Levecque and he acquiesced to Kha being sent to Phu Cam, his parish of residence. However, some historians have challenged this notion of why Kha had resigned and claimed that he resigned as Grand Chamberlain because his "reformist plans had been wrecked."

Later life

Farm life 
Kha was worried about the future of his family as he did not accumulate much savings. He would have to rely on the paddy fields near his home. It was at this time, that Kha's wife, who was born to an agricultural family, helped him greatly. He showed great respect for her and told his children that without her he would have panicked when he suddenly became a poor farmer.

Kha was helped by his neighbours who allowed him to rent more land from them without payment until he got a few good crops. Also, his ex-colleagues at the Imperial Court secretly sent him part of their salaries.

This difficult period was important in the raising of his children. From a young age, the children were forced to work hard in the fields. Diem, his third son, was required to work in the field when he was not in school. These lean years taught the Ngô Dinh children how to be frugal and not to desire wealth. He was also able to tutor his children.

During his episcopal ordination in 1938 as the third Vietnamese bishop, Kha's second son Ngô Đình Thục, recalled these difficult times that the family and especially his father had gone through. Thuc compared his father's fate to that of the biblical character Job because "Like Job, he had lost everything – dignity, fortune, health during the good fight."

Rehabilitation 
In the fall of 1919, Ngô Dinh Kha was honoured by the Nguyễn Imperial Court. Emperor Khải Định restored to Kha the title of Great Scholar Assistant to the Throne with the permanent rank of Minister. He would also able to receive the uncollected payments of his pension.

Kha's death 
In January 1925, a few days before Tet, Ngô Dinh Kha suddenly began to run a high fever and cough. He was diagnosed with severe pneumonia with complications. He died at his home on January 27, 1925. His body was buried in the family vault in Phu Cam Cemetery.

Family 
Upon Kha's death he left behind his wife, Anna Nguyen Thi Than, and sons, Khôi, Thuc, Diệm, Nhu, Cẩn and Luyện, and daughters, Giao, Hiep and Hoang. Khôi would later become a governor but would be assassinated together with his son by the Việt Minh. Thuc ended up becoming Vietnam's third ordained Catholic bishop. Diem would become the first president of an independent South Vietnam and Nhu would help him in the running of the country. Hiep's son, Kha's grandson, Francis Xavier Nguyễn Văn Thuận became a Cardinal in the Catholic Church in 2001 and in 2017, he was named as Venerable by Pope Francis, opening up the road to possible sainthood.

Historical assessment of Kha 
Edward Miller claims that many people saw Kha was a "collaborator and an apologist for colonialism," because he worked in the French dominated court. However, he goes on to state that Kha was not a Francophile but was guided by "reformist ambitions" and that he believed that independence from France could only come about with reform in politics, society and culture. Kha believed that the Quoc Hoc that he established would help Vietnam achieve that growth.

A contrasting understanding about Kha, which views him much more harshly comes from Seth Jacobs’ America's Miracle Man in Vietnam. This study focuses much more on Ngô Đình Diệm and considers Kha to be much colder with regards to his family. He states that Kha was "not a nurturant or forgiving father."  Edward Miller states that Kha was a "demanding father" and recounts a story of how Kha forced Diem to eat fish every Friday as was the Catholic tradition. However, Diem had developed an allergy to fish and would throw up. Kha still insisted that Diem finish whatever was served.

References 
 

 

Vietnamese Roman Catholics
Government ministers of Vietnam
Vietnamese anti-communists